Malcolm Scott Carpenter (May 1, 1925 – October 10, 2013) was an American naval officer and aviator, test pilot, aeronautical engineer, astronaut, and aquanaut.  He was one of the Mercury Seven astronauts selected for NASA's Project Mercury in April 1959. Carpenter was the second American (after John Glenn) to orbit the Earth and the fourth American in space, after Alan Shepard, Gus Grissom, and Glenn.

Commissioned into the U.S. Navy in 1949, Carpenter became a naval aviator, flying a Lockheed P-2 Neptune with Patrol Squadron 6 (VP-6) on reconnaissance and anti-submarine warfare missions along the coasts of Soviet Union and China during the Korean War and the Cold War. In 1954, he attended the U.S. Naval Test Pilot School at NAS Patuxent River, Maryland, and became a test pilot.

The following year, Carpenter was selected as one of the Mercury Seven astronauts. He was backup to Glenn during the latter's Mercury Atlas 6 orbital mission. Carpenter flew the next mission, Mercury-Atlas 7, in the spacecraft he named Aurora 7. Due to a series of malfunctions, the spacecraft landed  downrange from its intended splashdown point, but both pilot and spacecraft were retrieved.

Carpenter obtained permission from NASA to take a leave of absence to join the U.S. Navy SEALAB project as an aquanaut. During training he suffered injuries that grounded him, making him unavailable for further spaceflights. In 1965, he spent 28 days living on the ocean floor off the coast of California as part of SEALAB II. He returned to NASA as Executive Assistant to the Director of the Manned Spacecraft Center, then joined the Navy's Deep Submergence Systems Project in 1967 as Director of Aquanaut Operations for SEALAB III. He retired from NASA in 1967, and from the Navy in 1969.

Early life
Malcolm Scott Carpenter was born on May 1, 1925, in Boulder, Colorado, the son of Marion Scott Carpenter (1901–1973), a research chemist, and Florence Kelso ( Noxon, known in her family as "Toye"; 1900–1962). Carpenter, known in his childhood as Bud or Buddy, moved with his parents to New York City, where his father had been awarded a postdoctoral research post at Columbia University, in 1925.

In the summer of 1927, Carpenter's mother, who was ill with tuberculosis, returned to Boulder with him (mountain air was then believed to aid recovery). Her condition deteriorated, and she entered the Mesa Vista Sanatorium in 1930.  She recovered sufficiently to become chief medical librarian at Boulder Community Hospital in 1945. His father remained in New York, and he seldom saw him. He found it hard to find work during the Great Depression, but eventually secured a good position at Givaudan. His parents divorced in 1945, and his father remarried.

Carpenter lived with his maternal grandparents in the family home at the corner of Aurora Avenue and Seventh Street. He later denied naming his spacecraft Aurora 7 after Aurora Avenue. He was educated at University Hill Elementary School in Boulder, and Boulder High School, where he played the clarinet, was a cheerleader, and served on the editorial board of the student newspaper. He was a Boy Scout, and earned the rank of Second Class Scout.

Naval service
Like many people in Boulder, Carpenter was deeply affected by the Japanese attack on Pearl Harbor, which brought the United States into World War II, and he resolved to become a naval aviator. On February 12, 1943, he enlisted at the U.S. Navy's recruiting officer at Lowry Field near Denver. He then traveled to the headquarters of the 12th Naval District in San Francisco, where he was accepted into the Navy's V-5 Aviation Cadet Training Program.

The Navy had recruited plenty of potential aviators at this time, so to retain young men like Carpenter, the V-12 Navy College Training Program was created, whereby cadets attended college until their service was required. When Carpenter graduated from high school, he became a V-12A aviation cadet at Colorado College in Colorado Springs. Three semesters there were followed by six months of preflight training at Saint Mary's College of California in Moraga, California, and primary flight training at Ottumwa, Iowa, in a Stearman N2S for four months. The war ended before he finished training, so the Navy released him from active duty in September 1945.

After visiting his father and stepmother in New York, Carpenter returned to Boulder in November 1945 to study aeronautical engineering at the University of Colorado at Boulder. He was given credit for his previous study, and entered as a junior. While there he joined Delta Tau Delta International Fraternity. He was severely injured in a car accident on September 14, 1946, after he fell asleep at the wheel of his 1934 Ford.  The car went over a cliff and overturned. At the end of his senior year, he missed his final examination in heat transfer; a washed-out bridge prevented him from getting to class. This left him one requirement short of a degree. On May 29, 1962, after his Mercury flight, the university granted him his Bachelor of Science degree because "his subsequent training as an astronaut more than made up for the deficiency in the subject of heat transfer."

Carpenter met Rene Louise Price, a fellow student at the University of Colorado, where she studied history and music. She was a member of the Delta Delta Delta sorority. Her parents had also separated when she was young, and her mother too suffered from tuberculosis. They were married at St. John's Episcopal Church in Boulder in September 1948.

On October 31, 1949, Carpenter was recruited by the Navy's Direct Procurement Program (DPP) as its 500th candidate. He reported to Naval Air Station Pensacola, Florida, for pre-flight training, from which he graduated on March 6, 1950. He then commenced primary flight training at Naval Air Station Whiting Field, learning to fly in an SNJ trainer. He then went to Naval Air Station Corpus Christi for advanced training. Most newly-trained naval aviators—including Carpenter—aspired to fly jet fighters, but in view of his responsibilities as a husband and father, he elected the less dangerous option of flying multi-engine patrol aircraft, and his advanced training was in the Consolidated PB4Y-2 Privateer, a single-tail version of the Consolidated B-24 Liberator. Rene pinned his aviator wings on him on April 19, 1951.

After three months at the Fleet Airborne Electronics Training School in San Diego, California, Carpenter went to a Lockheed P-2 Neptune transitional training unit at Whidbey Island, Washington, after which he was assigned to Patrol Squadron 6 (VP-6), based at Naval Air Station Barbers Point, Hawaii, in November 1951. On his first deployment, Carpenter flew on reconnaissance and anti-submarine warfare missions from Naval Air Station Atsugi in Japan during the Korean War. On his second deployment, forward-based at Naval Air Facility Adak, Alaska, he flew surveillance missions along the Soviet and Chinese coasts. For his third and final deployment, he was based on Guam, flying missions off the coast of China. He was designated as patrol plane commander, the only one in VP-6 with the rank of lieutenant (junior grade)—all the rest held higher rank. 

Impressed with his performance, the skipper of VP-6, Commander Guy Howard, recommended Carpenter's appointment to the U.S. Naval Test Pilot School. Carpenter was part of Class 13, at NAS Patuxent River, Maryland, in 1954. He flew aircraft such as the AD Skyraider and the Martin P4M Mercator. For the first time, he flew jets, including the F9F Panther, F11F Tiger and A3D Skywarrior. He remained at Patuxent River until 1957, working as a test pilot in the Electronics Test Division.

NASA career

Mercury Seven 

On October 4, 1957, the Soviet Union launched Sputnik 1, the first artificial satellite. This shattered Americans' confidence in their technological superiority, creating a wave of anxiety known as the Sputnik crisis. Among his responses, President Dwight D. Eisenhower launched the Space Race. The National Aeronautics and Space Administration (NASA) was established on October 1, 1958, as a civilian agency to develop space technology. One of its first initiatives was Project Mercury, which aimed to launch a man into Earth orbit, evaluate his capabilities in space, and return him safely to the Earth.

The first astronauts intake was drawn from the ranks of military test pilots. The service records of 508 graduates of test pilot schools were obtained from the United States Department of Defense. From these, 110 were found that matched the minimum standards: the candidates had to be younger than 40, possess a bachelor's degree or equivalent and to be  or less. While these were not all strictly enforced, the height requirement was firm, owing to the size of the Project Mercury spacecraft. DPP was restricted to those with bachelor's degrees, so it was assumed that Carpenter had one.

The number of candidates was then reduced to 32, which seemed a more than adequate number from which to select 12 astronauts. The degree of interest also indicated that far fewer would drop out during training than anticipated, which would result in training astronauts who would not be required to fly Project Mercury missions. It was therefore decided to halve the number of astronauts.

Then came a grueling series of physical and psychological tests at the Lovelace Clinic and the Wright Aerospace Medical Laboratory. Carpenter was considered the most physically fit by his peers; he had the lowest body fat, scored highest on the treadmill and cycling tests, and was able to hold his breath the longest. This was despite the fact that he had smoked a pack of cigarettes a day since joining the Navy in 1943, and did not quit smoking until 1985.

NASA's Charles J. Donlan called Carpenter's home on April 3, 1959, to inform him that he had been one of the seven men selected. Rene answered; Carpenter was on Hornet, but she could reach him. Carpenter called Donlan from a wharfside pay phone to accept the offer. Hornet skipper, Captain Marshall W. White, refused to release Carpenter until the Chief of Naval Operations, Admiral Arleigh Burke was able to persuade him.

The identities of the seven were announced at a press conference at Dolley Madison House in Washington, D.C., on April 9, 1959: Carpenter, Gordon Cooper, John Glenn, Gus Grissom, Wally Schirra, Alan Shepard, and Deke Slayton. The magnitude of the challenge ahead of them was made clear a few weeks later, on the night of May 18, 1959, when the seven astronauts gathered at Cape Canaveral to watch their first rocket launch, of an SM-65D Atlas, which was similar to the one that was to carry them into orbit. A few minutes after liftoff, it spectacularly exploded, lighting up the night sky. The astronauts were stunned. Shepard turned to Glenn and said: "Well, I'm glad they got that out of the way."

Mercury-Atlas 7

Carpenter, along with the other six Mercury astronauts, oversaw the development of the Mercury spacecraft. Each had a specialty; Carpenter's was the onboard navigational equipment.  He served as backup pilot on Mercury-Atlas 6 for Glenn, who flew the first U.S. orbital mission aboard Friendship 7 in February 1962. Carpenter, serving as capsule communicator on this flight, can be heard saying "Godspeed, John Glenn" on the recording of Glenn's liftoff.

The next mission was a second manned orbital flight to be flown by Slayton (in a capsule he would have named Delta 7), but he was suddenly grounded for an atrial fibrillation.  Carpenter was assigned to replace him instead of Slayton's backup, Schirra, as Carpenter had more training time in the simulators. In contrast to Glenn's flight, Mercury-Atlas 7 was planned as a scientific mission rather than an engineering one.

After the most trouble-free countdown of Project Mercury to date, Carpenter flew into space on May 24, 1962, watched by 40 million television viewers. He performed five onboard experiments per the flight plan, and became the first American astronaut to eat solid food in space. He also identified the mysterious "fireflies" observed by Glenn during Friendship 7 as particles of frozen liquid loosened from the outside of the spacecraft, which he could produce by rapping on the wall near the window. He renamed them "frostflies".

Carpenter's performance in space was the subject of criticism and controversy.  NASA's 1989 official history of Project Mercury says that until the third pass over Hawaii, Christopher C. Kraft Jr. (who directed the flight from Cape Canaveral) "considered this mission the most successful to date; everything had gone perfectly except for some overexpenditure of hydrogen peroxide fuel". However, then problems occurred and Kraft wrote in his 2001 memoir "He was completely ignoring our request to check his instruments... I swore an oath that Scott Carpenter would never again fly in space." Kraft went so far as to name the chapter of his memoirs dealing with Carpenter's flight The Man Malfunctioned.

Unnoticed by ground control or pilot, however, the overexpenditure of fuel was caused by an intermittently malfunctioning pitch horizon scanner (PHS) that later malfunctioned at reentry. Still, NASA later reported that Carpenter had:

At the retrofire event, the PHS malfunctioned once more, forcing Carpenter to manually control his reentry. "The malfunction of the pitch horizon scanner circuit [a component of the automatic control system] dictated that the pilot manually control the spacecraft attitudes during this event."

The thrusters had a set sequence of ignition, and that sequence was delayed by Carpenter manually firing them. This added another , producing a  overshoot.

During reentry, there was a great deal of public concern over whether Carpenter had survived. Broadcasting from a CBS news van in Florida, Walter Cronkite painted a grim picture. Yet Aurora 7s Search And Rescue And Homing (SARAH) beacon broadcast its precise location, and the recovery vessels, the aircraft carrier  and the destroyer , were on their way,  but NASA did not pass this information along to the news media.
Knowing that the recovery vessels might take some time to get to him, and aware of the danger of Aurora 7 foundering, as had happened to Grissom's Liberty Bell 7, Carpenter made his way out through the neck of the spacecraft, something the less agile Glenn had been unable to do. He inflated his life raft, climbed into it, and awaited rescue. The sea around him was stained with green dye.

About 36 minutes after splashdown, Carpenter spotted two aircraft. A P2V Neptune from Patrol Squadron 18 flying out of Naval Air Station Jacksonville was the first to sight and mark Carpenter's position. It was followed by a Piper Apache, which circled and photographed. Carpenter then knew he had been located. They were followed by SC-54 Skymaster aircraft, from one of which parachuted two frogmen, while another dropped a flotation collar which the frogmen attached to Aurora 7. An Air Force SA-16 Albatross arrived to collect them, but NASA Mission Control forbade it for fear that the seaplane might break up, although the crew did not consider the swell dangerous. After three hours, Carpenter was picked up by a HSS-2 Sea King helicopter, which took him to Intrepid, while Aurora 7 was recovered by John R. Pierce.

Postflight analysis described the PHS malfunction as "mission critical" but noted that the pilot "adequately compensated" for "this anomaly ... in subsequent inflight procedures," confirming that backup systems—human pilots—could succeed when automatic systems fail. Some memoirs, such as that of Gene Cernan, have revived the simmering controversy over who or what, exactly, was to blame for the overshoot, suggesting, for example, that Carpenter was distracted by the science and engineering experiments dictated by the flight plan and by the well-reported fireflies phenomenon:

Yet fuel consumption and other aspects of the vehicle operation were, during Project Mercury, as much if not more the responsibility of the ground controllers. Gene Kranz, assistant flight director at the time, acknowledged that and placed some of the blame on the shoulders of ground control: "A crewman distracted and behind in the flight plan is a danger to the mission and himself. ... The ground had waited too long in addressing the fuel status and should have been more forceful in getting on with the checklists."  Moreover, hardware malfunctions went unidentified, while organizational tensions between the astronaut office and the flight controller office—tensions that NASA did not resolve until the later Gemini and Apollo programs—may account for much of the latter-day criticism of Carpenter's performance during his flight.

"One might argue," wrote Tom Wolfe, "that Carpenter had mishandled the reentry, but to accuse him of panic made no sense in light of the telemetered data concerning his heart rate and his respiratory rate." Schirra would later experience problems with the override button on his flight.

Ocean research

Carpenter met Jacques Cousteau, who was giving a public lecture at the Massachusetts Institute of Technology in 1963. When Carpenter expressed interest in underwater research, Cousteau suggested that he might consider the U.S. Navy's SEALAB project. Carpenter sought out Captain George F. Bond from SEALAB, and obtained permission from NASA to take a leave of absence to join the project. While in Bermuda, Carpenter sustained a grounding injury from a motorcycle accident, when he crashed into a coral wall.

In 1965, for SEALAB II, Carpenter spent 28 days living on the ocean floor off the coast of California. He suffered another injury when his right index finger was wounded by the toxic spines of a scorpion fish. SEALAB II coincided with Cooper's Gemini 5 mission, and he and Carpenter held the first conversation between a craft in outer space and one on the ocean floor.

Carpenter returned to NASA as Executive Assistant to the Director of the Manned Spacecraft Center, then joined the Navy's Deep Submergence Systems Project based in Bethesda, Maryland, as a Director of Aquanaut Operations for SEALAB III in 1967. In the aftermath of aquanaut Berry L. Cannon's death while attempting to repair a leak in SEALAB III, Carpenter volunteered to dive down to SEALAB and help return it to the surface, although SEALAB was ultimately salvaged in a less hazardous way.

After failing to regain mobility in his arm after two surgical interventions in 1964 and 1967, Carpenter, suffering from avascular necrosis, was ruled ineligible for spaceflight and further deep-sea missions. He spent the last part of his NASA career developing underwater training to help astronauts with future spacewalks. He resigned from NASA in August 1967, and retired from the Navy with the rank of commander in 1969, after which he founded Sea Sciences, Inc., a corporation for developing programs for utilizing ocean resources and improving environmental health.

Carpenter became a consultant to sport and diving manufacturers, and to the film industry on space flight and oceanography. He gave talks, and appeared in television documentaries on these subjects. He was involved in projects related to biological pest control and waste disposal, and for the production of energy from industrial and agricultural wastes. He also appeared in television commercials for brands such as Oldsmobile, Standard Oil of California, Nintendo, and Atari. He wrote a pair of technothrillers, The Steel Albatross (1991) and Deep Flight (1994), and in 2003 he published his autobiography, For Spacious Skies: The Uncommon Journey of a Mercury Astronaut, which was co-written with his daughter, Kristen Stoever.

Personal life

Carpenter was married four times, divorced three times, and had a total of eight children by three wives, seven of whom survived to adulthood. He married his first wife, Rene, in September 1948. They had five children: Marc Scott, Kristen Elaine, Candace Noxon, Robyn Jay, and Timothy Kit, who died in infancy. By 1968, Carpenter and his wife had separated, with him living in California and Rene with their children in Washington, D.C.  The Carpenters divorced in 1972. In 1972, Carpenter married his second wife, Maria Roach, the daughter of film producer Hal Roach. Together, they had two children: Matthew Scott, and Nicholas Andre, who would later become a filmmaker. He married his third wife, Barbara Curtin, in 1988.  They had a son, Zachary Scott, when Carpenter was in his 60s.  The marriage ended in divorce a few years later. In 1999, when he was 74, Carpenter married his fourth wife, Patricia Barrett. They resided in Vail, Colorado.

In September 2013, Carpenter suffered a stroke and was hospitalized in the Swedish Medical Center in Denver. He was then admitted to the Denver Hospice Inpatient Care Center.  He died on October 10, 2013, at the age of 88.  He was survived by his wife, four sons and two daughters, a granddaughter, and five step-grandchildren. The Governor of Colorado, John Hickenlooper, ordered flags to be flown at half mast. A public memorial service was held at St. John's Episcopal Church in Boulder, which was attended by fellow astronauts John Glenn, Gene Cernan, Charles Duke, Rusty Schweickart, Jack Schmitt, David Scott, Charles Bolden, Dan Brandenstein, Bob Crippen, Bruce McCandless II, Dick Truly and Charles D. Walker. His remains were cremated and the ashes buried on the family's ranch near Steamboat Springs, Colorado. When asked in 2012 what his legacy would be, he replied: "I was an astronaut and an aquanaut."

Awards and honors

U.S. Government awards
 Navy Astronaut Wings
 Legion of Merit
 Distinguished Flying Cross
 NASA Distinguished Service Medal
 Navy Unit Commendation
 American Campaign Medal
 World War II Victory Medal
 China Service Medal
 National Defense Service Medal with bronze star
 Korean Service Medal with two battle stars
 United Nations Korea Medal
 Republic of Korea Presidential Unit Citation

Civilian awards
 University of Colorado Recognition Medal
 Collier Trophy
 New York City Gold Medal of Honor
 Elisha Kent Kane Medal
 Numismatica Italiana Award
 Boy Scouts of America Silver Buffalo Award

In 1962, Boulder community leaders dedicated Scott Carpenter Park and Pool in honor of native son turned Mercury astronaut. The park features at 25-foot tall climbable metal rocket spaceship. The now-closed Aurora 7 Elementary School, also in Boulder, was named for Carpenter's spacecraft. Scott Carpenter Middle School in Westminster, Colorado, was named in his honor, as was M. Scott Carpenter Elementary School in Old Bridge, New Jersey. The Scott Carpenter Space Analog Station was placed on the ocean floor in 1997 and 1998. It was named in honor of his SEALAB work in the 1960s.

Carpenter was named to the International Air & Space Hall of Fame in 2008 and the International Space Hall of Fame in 1981. Carpenter, along with the rest of the Mercury Seven astronauts, was named to the U.S. Astronaut Hall of Fame in 1990. In 2017, Carpenter was inducted into the National Aviation Hall of Fame.

In popular culture
Speaking from the blockhouse at the launch of Friendship 7, Carpenter said "Godspeed, John Glenn," as Glenn's vehicle rose off the launch pad to begin the first U.S. orbital mission on February 20, 1962.  This quote was included in the voiceovers of the teaser trailer for the 2009 Star Trek film. The audio phrase is used in Kenny G's "Auld Lang Syne" (The Millennium Mix). It is also used as a part of an audio introduction for the Ian Brown song "My Star".

The character of Scott Tracy in the Thunderbirds television series was named after Carpenter. In the 1983 film, The Right Stuff, Carpenter was played by Charles Frank.  Although his appearance was relatively minor, the film played up Carpenter's friendship with Glenn, as played by Ed Harris. This film is based on the 1979 book of the same name by Tom Wolfe. In the 2015 ABC TV series The Astronaut Wives Club,  Carpenter was portrayed by Wilson Bethel, and Rene Carpenter by Yvonne Strahovski. In the 2020 Disney+ miniseries The Right Stuff, Carpenter was played by James Lafferty.

Books
 We Seven: By the Astronauts Themselves,  co-written with Gordon Cooper, John Glenn, Gus Grissom, Wally Schirra, Alan Shepard and Deke Slayton.
 For Spacious Skies: The Uncommon Journey of a Mercury Astronaut,  or the revised paperback edition , Carpenter's biography, co-written with his daughter Kristen Stoever; describes his childhood, his experiences as a naval aviator, a Mercury astronaut, including an account of what went wrong, and right, on the flight of Aurora 7.
 The Steel Albatross, . Science fiction. A technothriller set around the life of a fighter pilot in the US Navy's Top Gun school.
 Deep Flight, . Science fiction. Follow-on to The Steel Albatross.

Notes

References

External links

 Iven C. Kincheloe Awards
 Carpenter at International Space Hall of Fame
   Rene Carpenter's article for Life magazine on Carpenter's flight.
 

 
1925 births
2013 deaths
1962 in spaceflight
American aerospace engineers
American autobiographers
American business executives
American male non-fiction writers
United States Navy personnel of the Korean War
American Korean War pilots
American test pilots
American underwater divers
Aquanauts
Aviators from Colorado
Collier Trophy recipients
Mercury Seven
NASA people
People from Boulder, Colorado
Recipients of the Distinguished Flying Cross (United States)
Recipients of the Legion of Merit
Recipients of the NASA Distinguished Service Medal
Rehoboth Carpenter family
United States Astronaut Hall of Fame inductees
United States Naval Aviators
United States Naval Test Pilot School alumni
United States Navy astronauts
United States Navy officers
University of Colorado alumni
Writers from Colorado
20th-century American businesspeople
United States Navy personnel of World War II